Peñalver may refer to:
 Peñalver, municipality in the province of Guadalajara, Castile-La Mancha, Spain
 Fernando de Peñalver Municipality, municipalities in the eastern Venezuelan state of Anzoátegui

People named Peñalver:
 Antonio Peñalver (born 1968), Spanish decathlete
 Carmen Peñalver (born 1961), Spanish politician
 Diana Peñalver (born 1965), Spanish actress
 Fernando Peñalver (1765–1837), Venezuelan independence leader
 Leandro Peñalver (born 1961), Cuban sprinter

Eduardo Peñalver (born 1973), Cornell Law School Dean